Brodarica is a village located 8 km south of Šibenik, Croatia. It is located on the Adriatic Sea coast, across the island of Krapanj and west of the bay of Morinje, by the D8 state road. The population is 2,534 (census 2011).

Image gallery

References

Populated places in Šibenik-Knin County